Sudan Organisation Against Torture (SOAT) is a human rights group based in London, which works to combat human rights violations in Sudan, particularly in the Dafur region.

References

External links
Sudan Organisation Against Torture Website
 Sudan Organisation Against Torture
SOAT
SOAT wins award

Human rights organisations based in the United Kingdom
Imprisonment and detention
War in Darfur